La Vita Nuova is the seventh studio album by American singer-songwriter Maria McKee. It was released on March 13, 2020 under Fire Records.

Critical reception
La Vita Nuova was met with generally favorable reviews from critics. At Metacritic, which assigns a weighted average rating out of 100 to reviews from mainstream publications, this release received an average score of 80, based on 7 reviews.

Track listing

Charts

References

2020 albums
Fire Records albums
Maria McKee albums